"Cameo Afro" is a song written and performed by American rappers Big Daddy Kane, GZA and Suga Bang Bang from 2007 soundtrack to animated television series Afro Samurai. It was produced by the RZA and mixed by Charlie Watts.

It is the first time that Big Daddy Kane and GZA have worked in the same studio after they were members of Cold Chillin' Records, during which time GZA was rumored to be a ghostwriter for Kane, and it is hailed as a historical collaboration.

External links
 RZA interview with HipHopgame.com
 Afro Samurai Official Website

2007 songs
Big Daddy Kane songs
Song recordings produced by RZA
Songs written by Big Daddy Kane
Songs written by RZA